Ashar Bernardus (born 21 December 1985) is a football midfielder who currently plays for Centro Dominguito in the Curacao League.

International career
He made his national debut with the Netherlands Antilles Nation Football Team on September 8, 2006 against Guyana, with the result of the match 0-5 in Guyana's favor.  Bernardus made his first goal with the Netherlands Antilles national team on October 23, 2008, against the Cuba national team in a 7-1 match that resulted in Cuba's victory.  On August 19, 2011, Bernardus made his debut with the Curaçao national football team in a friendly match against the Dominican Republic that Curaçao lost, 1-0.

References

External links
Drug article
Soccerway profile

1985 births
Living people
Curaçao footballers
Association football midfielders
Curaçao international footballers
People from Willemstad
2017 CONCACAF Gold Cup players